Denis Biba (born 17 June 1995) is an Albanian footballer who plays for Erzeni Shijak as a defender.

References

External links

 Profile - FSHF

1995 births
Living people
Footballers from Kavajë
Albanian footballers
Association football defenders
KF Erzeni players
Besa Kavajë players
KF Laçi players
Kategoria Superiore players